De Ribera is a Spanish surname. Notable people with the surname include:

Alonso de Ribera (1560–1617), Spanish soldier
Juan de Ribera (1532–1611), Spanish Roman Catholic archbishop
Jusepe de Ribera (1591–1652), Spanish painter
Pedro de Ribera (1681–1742), Spanish Baroque architect

Spanish-language surnames